The 1924 Newfoundland general election was held on 2 June 1924 to elect members of the 26th General Assembly of Newfoundland in the Dominion of Newfoundland. The Liberal-Progressives and Liberal-Conservative Progressives were new parties formed as a result of the collapse of the ruling Liberal Reform Party. The Liberal-Conservative Progressives were led by Walter Stanley Monroe and won the election weeks after the party's creation. During his time in office, Monroe alienated a number of his supporters: Peter J. Cashin, F. Gordon Bradley, C. E. Russell, Phillip F. Moore, Lewis Little and H.B.C. Lake, who all defected to the opposition Liberal-Progressive Party. In 1925, universal suffrage was introduced in Newfoundland: women aged 25 and older were allowed to vote (men could vote at the age of 21). Monroe was replaced by Frederick C. Alderdice as Prime Minister in August 1928.

Seat totals

Elected members
 Bay de Verde
 Richard Cramm Liberal-Conservative
 John C. Puddester Liberal-Conservative
 Bonavista Bay
 Walter S. Monroe Liberal-Conservative
 Lewis Little Liberal-Conservative
 William C. Winsor Liberal-Conservative
 Burgeo-LaPoile
 Walter M. Chambers Liberal-Conservative
 Burin
 H. B. C. Lake Liberal-Conservative
 J. J. Lang Liberal-Conservative
 Carbonear
 Robert Duff Liberal-Progressive
 Ferryland
 Peter J. Cashin Liberal-Conservative
 Phillip F. Moore Liberal-Conservative
 Fogo
 Richard Hibbs Liberal-Progressive
 Fortune Bay
 William R. Warren Independent
 Harris M. Mosdell Liberal-Progressive, elected 1926
 Harbour Grace
 Albert E. Hickman Liberal-Progressive
 John R. Bennett Liberal-Conservative
 C. E. Russell Liberal-Conservative
 Harbour Main
 William J. Woodford Liberal-Conservative
 C. J. Cahill Liberal-Conservative
 Placentia and St. Mary's
 Michael S. Sullivann Liberal-Conservative
 William J. Walsh Liberal-Conservative
 E. Sinnott Liberal-Conservative
 Port de Grave
 F. Gordon Bradley Liberal-Conservative
 St. Barbe
 J. H. Scammell Liberal-Progressive
 St. George's
 T. J. Power Liberal-Conservative
 St. John's East
 William J. Higgins Liberal-Conservative
 Cyril J. Fox Liberal-Conservative (speaker)
 N. J. Vinnicombe Liberal-Conservative
 William E. Brophy Liberal-Progressive, elected in 1927
 St. John's West
 John C. Crosbie Liberal-Conservative
 William J. Browne Liberal-Conservative
 W. L. Linegar Liberal-Conservative
 Trinity Bay
 William W. Halfyard Liberal-Progressive
 I. R. Randell Liberal-Progressive
 Edwin J. Godden Liberal-Progressive
 Twillingate
 Kenneth M. Brown Liberal-Progressive
 George F. Grimes Liberal-Progressive
 Thomas G. W. Ashbourne Liberal-Progressive

References 
 

1924
1924 elections in North America
1924 elections in Canada
Politics of the Dominion of Newfoundland
1924 in Newfoundland
June 1924 events